Kédougou Region is a region of Senegal. It was created in 2008.  Formerly it was a department in the Region of Tambacounda.

Kedougou has a number of ecotourism attractions.

Departments
Kédougou Region has three departments:
Kédougou Département
Salémata Département
Saraya Département

Geography
Kédougou is traversed by the northwesterly line of equal latitude and longitude.

References 

 
States and territories established in 2008
Regions of Senegal